The Cape Range is a small subrange of the Kitimat Ranges, located on the southern end of Calvert Island, British Columbia, Canada.

References

Cape Range in the Canadian Mountain Encyclopedia

Kitimat Ranges
North Coast of British Columbia